The Whisky Distilleries of the United Kingdom is a book originally published in 1887. It was the result of a two-year tour of Scotland, Ireland and England by Alfred Barnard, in which he visited 162 whisky distilleries.

References

External links 
 https://whiskipedia.com/barnard/

1887 non-fiction books
British non-fiction books
Whisky
British distilled drinks
Books about food and drink